Juan Climaco Formell Cortina (August 2, 1942 – May 1, 2014) was a Cuban bassist, composer, and arranger, best known as the director of Los Van Van. He was a creator of popular danceable music and credited with bringing electronic instrumentation into the Cuban musical form.

His full name was Juan Clímaco (John Climacus) Formell Cortina.

His professional activity started in 1957 as musician of cabaret orchestras, radio and television. In 1959 he worked as bassist of Musical Band of Revolutionary Police. He died of liver disease at the age of 71 in 2014.

Awards 
In 1999, Juan Formell received a Grammy Award (Latin/Best Salsa Performance) for his work on the album "Llegó... Van Van – Van Van Is Here", recorded at Abdala Studios.

References

External links 
 soycubano.com

1942 births
2014 deaths
20th-century composers
21st-century composers
Cuban composers
Male composers
Latin Grammy Lifetime Achievement Award winners
Latin music songwriters
Cuban male musicians